German submarine U-356 was a Type VIIC U-boat of Nazi Germany's Kriegsmarine during World War II. The submarine was laid down in May 1940 at the Flensburger Schiffbau-Gesellschaft yard at Flensburg, launched on 16 September 1941, and commissioned on 20 December 1941.

Design

German Type VIIC submarines were preceded by the shorter Type VIIB submarines. U-356 had a displacement of  when at the surface and  while submerged. She had two shafts and two  propellers.

U-356 was fitted with five  torpedo tubes (four fitted at the bow and one at the stern), fourteen torpedoes, one  SK C/35 naval gun, 220 rounds, and a  C/30 anti-aircraft gun. The boat had a complement of between forty-four and sixty.

Service history

U-356 was ordered by the Kriegsmarine on 26 October 1939. She was laid down about six months later at the Flensburger Schiffbau-Gesellschaft yard at Flensburg, on 4 May 1940. The next year, U-356 was launched on 16 September 1941. She was formally commissioned on 20 December 1941.

Loss
All 46 crew members died in the event.
Source: For Posterity's Sake, a Royal Canadian Navy Historical Project

Wolfpacks
U-356 took part in six wolfpacks, namely:
 Pfeil (12 – 22 September 1942) 
 Blitz (22 – 26 September 1942) 
 Tiger (26 – 30 September 1942) 
 Wotan (5 – 19 October 1942) 
 Raufbold (11 – 22 December 1942) 
 Spitz (22 – 27 December 1942)

Summary of Raiding History

References

Bibliography

External links

Ships lost with all hands
1941 ships
Ships built in Flensburg
U-boats commissioned in 1941
U-boats sunk in 1942
U-boats sunk by depth charges
U-boats sunk by British warships
U-boats sunk by Canadian warships
World War II shipwrecks in the Atlantic Ocean
World War II submarines of Germany
German Type VIIC submarines